LightInTheBox Holding Co., Ltd. is an international online retail company that delivers products to consumers in over 200 countries and territories. It attracts the consumer by showing its lifestyle products through LightInTheBox.com, MiniInTheBox.com, and its other websites, which are available in 26 major languages as of October 2013.

History
LightInTheBox was founded in June 2006 by Quji (Alan) Guo, Xin (Kevin) Wen, Liang Zhang, Jun Liu and Chit Jeremy Chau. The company operated as Light In The Box Limited until March 2008, when it was restructured and incorporated as LightInTheBox Holding Co., Ltd., acting as the ultimate holding company.

The founders of LightInTheBox took the opportunity to build a company that would take advantage of China's manufacturing and supply chain. On June 6, 2013, LightInTheBox opened for trading on the New York Stock Exchange (NYSE) under the ticker symbol "LITB". In the three months leading up to June 30, 2013, LightInTheBox cleared $72.2 million in net revenue with 1.2 million customers served in the second quarter of 2013.

Products and services
As of October 2013, LightInTheBox offers products in three core categories: apparel, small gadgets, and home and garden. As of March 31, 2013, LightInTheBox had more than 220,000 product listings, and added an average of 14,000 products each month in the preceding three months.

LightInTheBox uses global online marketing platforms such as Google and Facebook to reach consumers, accepts payments through major credit cards and electronic payment platforms such as PayPal, and delivers goods via major international couriers, including UPS, DHL and FedEx.

Financial results
Net revenues in the second quarter of 2013 were $72.2 million, an increase of 52.6% from $47.3 million in the same quarter of 2012, primarily driven by an increase of 140.0% in total number of customers served in the second quarter of 2013, which increased to 1.2 million from 0.5 million. Net income for the second quarter of 2013 was $0.6 million, compared to a net loss of $1.4 million in the same quarter of 2012. Net income margin improved to 0.9% from a negative 2.9% in the prior year period.

Net revenues in the second quarter of 2013 increased by 52.6% to $72.2 million from $47.3 million in the same quarter of 2012. The increase was primarily driven by growth in the number of customers and total orders.

References

External links
 
 https://www.sitejabber.com/reviews/www.lightinthebox.com#5022
 https://www.consumeraffairs.com/online/lightinthebox.html

Companies based in Beijing
Online retailers of China
Online companies of China
Chinese companies established in 2007
Internet properties established in 2007
2007 establishments in China
2013 initial public offerings